Sand Hill is a ghost town in Attala County, Mississippi, United States.

References

Former populated places in Attala County, Mississippi
Former populated places in Mississippi